Lioujia District is a rural district of about 21,392 residents in Tainan, Taiwan.

History
After the handover of Taiwan from Japan to the Republic of China in 1945, Lioujia was organized as a rural township of Tainan County. On 25 December 2010, Tainan County was merged with Tainan City and Lioujia was upgraded to a district of the city.

Geography
Lioujia District is bordered to the east by Nansi District; to the north by Liouying District and Dongshan District; to the south by Guantian District and Danei District, and to the west by Xiaying District.

Administrative divisions 
Liujia, Jiatung, Jianan, Longhu, Qijia, Erjia, Shuilin, Zhongshe, Guigang, Jingpu, Wangye and Daqiu Village.

Tourist attractions 
 Chishan Longhu Temple
 Nanyuan Recreationa Farm
 Shanhu Lake
 Siangong Temple
 World of Water Lilies
 Wushantou Reservoir
 Wushantou Prehistoric Remains

Transportation 

 TRA Linfengying Station

Notable natives 
 Chen Yu-lin, football athlete.
 Tien Hung-mao, Chairman of Straits Exchange Foundation (2016–2018)

References

External links 

 

Districts of Tainan